That Man from Tangier (Spanish:Aquel hombre de Tánger) is a 1953 American-Spanish adventure film directed by Luis María Delgado and Robert Elwyn and starring Nils Asther, Roland Young and Nancy Coleman. It was the final film of the British actor Young.

Synopsis
While on a trip to Europe, Mary Ellen gets drunk and marries a count she meets. Eager to get a divorce she follows him to the casbah in Tangier only to discover he is an impostor.

Cast
 Nils Asther as Henri 
 Roland Young as George 
 Nancy Coleman as Mary Ellen 
 Sara Montiel as Aixa 
 Margaret Wycherly as Mrs. Sanders 
 Sara Montiel as Aixa 
 Fernando Aguirre
 Julia Caba Alba
 Gary Land 
 Juana Mansó 
 José María Mompín 
 Matilde Muñoz Sampedro
 Emilio Santiago 
 José Suarez

References

Bibliography 
 Kenneth Von Gunden. Flights of Fancy: The Great Fantasy Films. McFarland, 1989.

External links 
 

1953 films
1953 adventure films
Spanish adventure films
1950s Spanish-language films
American adventure films
American black-and-white films
Spanish black-and-white films
United Artists films
Films directed by Luis María Delgado
Films set in Tangier
1950s American films
1950s Spanish films